Sascha Hommel (born 25 February 1990) is a German motorcycle racer. He won the IDM Supersport Championship in 2009 and he has also competed in the 125cc World Championship, the Moto2 World Championship and the Supersport World Championship.

Career statistics

Grand Prix motorcycle racing

By season

Races by year
(key)

Supersport World Championship

Races by year
(key)

References

External links

1990 births
Living people
German motorcycle racers
125cc World Championship riders
Moto2 World Championship riders
Supersport World Championship riders
People from Reichenbach im Vogtland
Sportspeople from Saxony